McFerrin is a surname.  Notable people with the surname include:

Bobby McFerrin (born 1950), American jazz and pop singer
John Berry McFerrin (1807–1887), Methodist preacher and chaplain of the Confederate States Army during the American Civil War
Melissa McFerrin, American basketball coach
Robert McFerrin (1921–2006), American opera singer
Taylor McFerrin, American DJ, music producer, keyboardist and beatboxer